84 Ursae Majoris, also known as HD 120198, is a star about 300 light years from the Earth, in the constellation Ursa Major. It is a 5th magnitude star, making it faintly visible to the naked eye of an observer far from city lights. It is an Ap star with an 1,100 gauss magnetic field, and an α2 CVn variable star, varying in brightness from magnitude 5.65 to 5.70, over a period of 1.37996 days. 84 Ursae Majoris is located just 70 arcseconds from the star LDS 2914, but that star is believed to be a background star not physically associated with 84 Ursae Majoris.

Gerhard Jackisch discovered that 84 Ursae Majoris is a variable star, with a period greater than one day, in 1972. It was given the variable star designation CR Ursae Majoris in 1974.

In 1994 John Rice and William Wehlau used Doppler imaging to map the distribution of iron and chromium on the surface of 84 Ursae Majoris. They found that the distribution of those elements across the surface was similar, and the abundances of those elements varied by a factor of 15 across the surface. Chromium was found to be about 600 times more abundant than on the Sun in the regions of the 84 Ursae Majoris surface with the minimum chromium abundance.

The size of 84 Ursae Majoris was measured in red light during 2015 and 2016, using the CHARA array. The limb darkened angular diameter was  milliarcseconds.

References

Ursa Major (constellation)
67231
120198
Durchmusterung objects
Ursae Majoris, CR
Ursae Majoris, 84
Alpha2 Canum Venaticorum variables
B-type main-sequence stars